The 1982–83 Xavier Musketeers men's basketball team represented Xavier University from Cincinnati, Ohio in the 1982–83 season. Led by head coach Bob Staak, the Musketeers finished with a 22–8 record (10–4 MCC), and won the MCC tournament to receive an automatic bid to the NCAA tournament. In the NCAA tournament, the Musketeers lost to fellow No. 12 seed Alcorn State in the Play-in round.

Roster

Schedule and results

|-
!colspan=9 style=| Regular season

|-
!colspan=9 style=| Midwestern Collegiate Conference tournament

|-
!colspan=9 style=| NCAA Tournament

References

Xavier
Xavier Musketeers men's basketball seasons
Xavier